Dempsey and Makepeace is a British television crime drama made by LWT for ITV, created and produced by Ranald Graham. Lead roles were played by Michael Brandon (Lieutenant Dempsey) and Glynis Barber (Detective Makepeace), who later married each other in real life in 1989.

Premise
The premise of Dempsey and Makepeace is the oddball pairing of two police detectives: an elegant British noblewoman, Sgt (Lady) Harriet Makepeace, and a streetwise working-class New Yorker, Lt James Dempsey, both working for an elite and armed unit of the London Metropolitan Police.

When his partner Joey dies in a botched drugs operation and he uncovers police corruption at the highest level, Dempsey is under threat of assassination. With help from his colleagues, he hurriedly leaves New York for London, on the pretense of an undercover international police exchange programme.

Harriet "Harry" Makepeace is the daughter of Lord Winfield (Ralph Michael), who owns an English stately home. Reference is made to his having formerly been in the Army or the Secret Service. Makepeace's grandfather is mentioned as having been a Victorian collector of antiques and rare items. Makepeace's mother is mentioned only once, by her maternal uncle Duffy and, it would seem she had died some time ago. Makepeace has made her way up through the ranks of the police force, despite sexism by her male counterparts and the physical demands of the job.

Although there is initial reluctance on both sides, Dempsey and Makepeace work as partners in a specialised task force, SI 10, and they make a good team. SI 10 is under the command of Gordon Spikings, played by Ray Smith. A fourth regular role is that of Chas, played by Tony Osoba, who provides useful research and communications in the SI 10 office and occasionally has a more active role.

Two double-length episodes were produced, the first being the pilot ("Armed and Extremely Dangerous"), with the second the series 3 two-part opener ("The Burning").

At the height of the series' popularity, and during season 2 particularly, the British tabloid press hounded the lead actors for off-screen stories regarding their then-budding personal relationship.

Much of the show's draw came from the good natured "will they or won’t they" interplay and a slowly evolving romance between the main protagonists, made possible by the obvious chemistry between the two lead actors. The show ended with an episode directed by Michael Brandon himself where Dempsey and Makepeace are forced to confront at least some of their feelings for one another, Makepeace leaves the force after having a vision of Dempsey being shot and killed in the line of duty. Dempsey tries to get her to return, after Dempsey's new partner - an old female friend of Makepeace - visits Makepeace to have a chat with Harry, it is implied from the conversation Makepeace is in love with Dempsey and can't bear to see anything happen to him. Dempsey gets her to help him when his new partner is injured. In the final scene it looks like they are going to join up as partners again as a call comes over the police radio they both smile at each other.

Main cast
Michael Brandon as Lieutenant James Dempsey NYPD
Glynis Barber as Detective Sergeant Lady Harriet "Harry" Makepeace
Ray Smith as Chief Superintendent Gordon Spikings
Tony Osoba as Detective Sergeant Charles ”Chas” Jarvis
Colin McFarlane as Detective Sergeant Watson
Jonathan Docker-Drysdale as Detective Sergeant Ward

Production

Filming locations
In episode 9 of series 1, "Cry God for Harry", Chilham Castle in Kent becomes Winfield Hall, the grand English estate of Lord Winfield (Ralph Michael), and Chilham Square also makes a brief appearance as Dempsey and Makepeace approach the grand gates to the estate.

Episode 1 of series 2, "Silver Dollar", used London Weekend Television's own studio building and reception area as the location for the fictional company Consolidated Westmore.

As with many films and television programmes of the era, extensive filming was conducted at the disused remains of the East Greenwich Gas Works (the present-day site of The O2).

A shot of Chief Superintendent Gordon Spikings (Ray Smith) in front of Cutty Sark was incorporated into the series' opening credit sequence.

Episodes

Dempsey and Makepeace ran for three series between 11 January 1985 and 1 November 1986. A total of 30 episodes were produced.

Broadcast
The show was originally broadcast on ITV between 11 January 1985 and 1 November 1986. From July 2009, the series was repeated on ITV3 in the UK, and again on ITV4 from July 2020. Forces TV will show from 1 September 2020

International broadcast
It was sold to many countries in Europe, including Eastern Bloc Czechoslovakia, Poland and Hungary. The programme was broadcast elsewhere worldwide, such as on Pakistan Television during 1985–86. The series was also syndicated to the U.S. airwaves in the autumn of 1985, usually broadcast on Saturday afternoons or early evenings. However, only the first 20 hours of the series were run in the U.S. By mid-January 1986, it was discontinued, with the 10 episodes of series 3 never being aired. To encourage interest, the show was marketed in the U.S. as being similar to a re-make of The Avengers, but, while well advertised, it never grew a substantial following.

Reception

Ratings

The show was also critically acclaimed.

All three series attained great popularity in the UK, achieving good ratings with 20 million viewers in the UK.

Home media
 In the UK, all three series of Dempsey and Makepeace were released on DVD in 2006 from Network DVD. They include interviews and audio commentaries on selected episodes with Michael Brandon and Glynis Barber. 
 In Portugal, all three series were released in 2004 by Prisvideo. There were no extras but the audio was in English with optional Portuguese subtitles, and the episodes were uncut*. (*Episode 'Judgement' has a scene removed towards the end where Judge Hackett is holding Bates hostage; however, it is believed this edit may have been made shortly after the episode was made, even before its original broadcast).
 Starting with December 2004, DVDs and VCDs with all the episodes of the series were gradually added in Poland to a TV-guide magazine TV Okey!. They soon re-appeared in another collection series and finally, on 8 December 2008 a box with Season 1 episodes was released. 
 In mid 2000s a DVD was released in the Czech Republic and in Slovakia with Slovak dubbing.

In other media
In the UK, Dempsey and Makepeace merchandise such as jigsaw puzzles, children's annuals and replica toy cars were produced.

References

External links

Unofficial Homepage

1985 British television series debuts
1986 British television series endings
1980s British crime drama television series
ITV television dramas
London Weekend Television shows
Television series by ITV Studios
Television shows set in London
British action television series
English-language television shows
British detective television series
Television duos